Julius Meimberg (11 January 1917 – 17 January 2012) was a German Luftwaffe military aviator during World War II, a fighter ace credited with 53 aerial victories—that is, 53 aerial combat encounters resulting in the destruction of the enemy aircraft—claimed in over 250 combat missions. In the 1960s, he invented an open-end spinning device and received patents in the US and Germany for it. In 1970, Meimberg founded the travel agency "Meimberg" and in 2001, he received the Rudolf-Diesel-Medaille for his achievements as an inventor.

Early life and career
Meimberg was born on 11 January 1917 in Münster in the Province of Westphalia, a province of the Kingdom of Prussia. He was the sixth and youngest child of a textile merchant, owner of a company founded by his grandfather.

World War II
World War II in Europe had begun on Friday 1 September 1939 when German forces invaded Poland. On 6 December 1939, Meimberg was posted to Jagdgeschwader 2 "Richthofen" (JG 2—2nd Fighter Wing), named after World War I fighter ace Manfred von Richthofen, which at the time was based at Zerbst. At Zerbst, Hauptmann Wolfgang Schellmann was tasked with the creation of the new II. Gruppe (2nd group) of JG 2 on 15 December. The Gruppe was staffed by personnel from I. Gruppe of JG 2, I. Gruppe of Jagdgeschwader 3 (JG 3—3rd Fighter Wing), and newly trained fighter pilots from the fighter pilot schools. There, Meimberg was assigned to 4. Staffel (4th squadron), headed by Oberleutnant Hans Hahn.

Meimberg was appointed Staffelkapitän (squadron leader) of 3. Staffel of JG 2 on 15 April 1941. He replaced Oberleutnant Hermann Hollweg who was transferred. On 4 August 1942, Meimberg succeeded Oberleutnant Rudolf Pflanz as Staffelkapitän of 11. Staffel of JG 2. Pflanz had been killed in action on 31 July.

Mediterranean Theater
On 4 November 1942, Meimberg and his 11. Staffel received orders to immediately transfer to Sicily. That same day, 30 men and their equipment were flown in three Junkers Ju 52 transport aircraft from the airfield Poix-Nord at Poix-de-Picardie in France to Coleman Army Airfield, refueling at Reims. On 8 November, the Staffel arrived in Trapani, located in the northwest of Siciliy, and then moved to Comiso which is in southeastern part of Sicily. On 15 November, Meimberg received orders to move his Staffel to Tunisia in North Africa where they were based at the Bizerte Airfield where they fought in the Tunisian campaign. That day, the Oberbefehlshaber Süd (Commander in Chief South), Generalfeldmarschall Albert Kesselring, ordered 11. Staffel disbanded, and its pilots and equipment assigned to II. Gruppe of Jagdgeschwader 53 (JG 53—53rd Fighter Wing). Due to Meimberg's intervention, Oberstleutnant Günther Freiherr von Maltzahn, the Geschwaderkommodore (wing commander) of JG 53, decided to retain 11. Staffel as its own entity and subordinated the Staffel to the Geschwaderstab (headquarters unit) of JG 53 while for the higher Luftwaffe authorities the Staffel was merged with 6. Staffel of JG 53.

On 17 December, Meimberg was given home-leave. During this vacation on 29 December, he married his fiancée Margret in Münster, the two had each other since school. The marriage produced a son, Gerrit, born 15 February 1946,  and another son, Helmut, born 11 August 1948, and their daughter Dorothee, born 19 October 1950. Following a brief honeymoon which the couple spent in Würzburg, Meimberg returned to his unit on 20 January 1943, which at the time was based at El Aouina, a municipality of Tunis, Tunisia.

Flying the Messerschmitt Bf 109 G-4 trop (Werknummer 16025—factory number) on 1 February 1943, Meimberg was wounded in aerial combat with Boeing B-17 Flying Fortress bombers near Pont du Fahs. The severe burns he sustained necessitated a lengthy stay in a hospital in Munich. During his convalescence, Meimberg was promoted to Hauptmann (captain) on 1 March, and awarded the Wound Badge in Silver in May. He returned to JG 53 on 19 August and was assigned to the Geschwaderstab. By this date, 11. Staffel of JG 2 had officially been disbanded and its pilots to various Staffeln of JG 53. The Geschwaderstab was based at the Hermitage of Camaldoli in Naples. Due to the Allied invasion of Italy, the location was abandoned on 9 September, moving to Littoria Airfield until September 16, and then to Centocelle Airfield near Rome. Shortly before Christmas, Meimberg left JG 53 again as his injuries sustained to his hands on 1 February required further treatment and skin grafting.

Defense of the Reich
On 24 April 1944, Meimberg was appointed Gruppenkommandeur of II. Gruppe of JG 53. He succeeded Hauptmann Gerhard Michalski who was transferred. On 24 October, Meimberg was awarded the Knight's Cross of the Iron Cross for 45 aerial victories. The presentation was made by Oberst Karl Hentschel, commander of the 7. Jagddivision (7th Fighter Division), at the Malmsheim Airfield.

Meimberg flew his last combat mission on 17 April 1945, strafing US vehicles travelling on the Autobahn near Nürnberg. During this attack, his Bf 109 G-14/AS was hit in the engine by anti-aircraft artillery. On 22 April, Meimberg moved II. Gruppe to an makeshift airfield near Waal. Aerial operation had practically came to a stop as US forces had started crossing the Danube the following day. Meimberg dismissed his soldiers and disbanded II. Gruppe in the early morning on 27 April.

Later life
Following World War II, Meimberg worked at the Nordhorn based textile company Rawe. There he gained knowledge of yarn production. In the summer of 1946, Meimberg and his wife bought two sheep. The sheep's wool was hand spun locally, inspiring Meimberg to think about automating the spinning process. Over the next months, he began experimenting and building a crude prototype for continuous yarn production, powered by a sewing machine motor, which he completed in 1948. Meimberg, presented his prototype to the German Patent and Trade Mark Office in Munich and the Deutsche Spinnereimaschinenbau AG Ingolstadt, the German spinning machine factory in Ingolstadt, owned by the Schubert & Salzer GmbH.

In 1970, Meimberg founded the travel agency "Meimberg" in Münster. For his achievements as an inventor, Meimberg was awarded the Rudolf-Diesel-Medaille in 2001.

Summary of career

Aerial victory claims
According to Obermaier, Meimberg was credited with 53 victories claimed in over 250 combat missions, all of which over the Western Front. Mathews and Foreman, authors of Luftwaffe Aces — Biographies and Victory Claims, researched the German Federal Archives and found records for 45 aerial victory claims, plus further 14 unconfirmed claims. All of these claims were achieved over the Western Allies, including four four-engined bomber.

Victory claims were logged to a map-reference (PQ = Planquadrat), for example "PQ 15 West TR-9". These sectors were then subdivided into 36 smaller units to give a location area 3 × 4 km in size.

Awards
 Iron Cross (1939) 2nd and 1st Class
 Front Flying Clasp of the Luftwaffe in Gold
 Honor Goblet of the Luftwaffe (30 July 1941)
 Wound Badge in Silver (May 1943)
 German Cross in Gold on 29 October 1942 as Oberleutnant in the 11./Jagdgeschwafer 2
 Knight's Cross of the Iron Cross on 24 October 1944 as Hauptmann and Gruppenkommandeur of the II./Jagdgeschwader 53

Publications

Notes

References

Citations

Bibliography

 
 
 
 
 
 
 
 
 
 
 
 
 
 
 
 
 
 
 
 
 
 
 

1917 births
2012 deaths
Luftwaffe pilots
Military personnel from Münster
German World War II flying aces
Recipients of the Gold German Cross
Recipients of the Knight's Cross of the Iron Cross
People from the Province of Westphalia
20th-century German inventors
Textile scientists
Invention award winners
Businesspeople in tourism